Prince Andrew School may refer to:
 Prince Andrew School (Saint Helena)
 Prince Andrew High School